Diego Gonzalo Pardow Lorenzo (born 1981) is a Chilean politician and Chile’s current Minister of Energy since September 6th, 2022.

He was the coordinator of Gabriel Boric's program in the 2021 Chilean general election.

References

External links
 

1981 births
Living people
University of Chile alumni
University of California, Berkeley alumni
Democratic Revolution politicians
Members of the Autonomist Movement
Social Convergence politicians